6312 Robheinlein is a bright Augusta or background asteroid from the inner regions of the asteroid belt, that measures approximately  in diameter. It was discovered on 14 September 1990, by American astronomer Henry Holt at the Palomar Observatory in California. The uncommon L-type asteroid was named for American science fiction writer Robert A. Heinlein.

Orbit and classification 

When applying the hierarchical clustering method to the asteroid's proper orbital elements, Robheinlein is considered to be a member of the Augusta family (as per Zappalà) as well as a non-family asteroid from the main belt's background population (as per Nesvorný).

It orbits the Sun in the inner asteroid belt at a distance of 2.0–2.3 AU once every 3 years and 3 months (1,179 days; semi-major axis of 2.18 AU). Its orbit has an eccentricity of 0.07 and an inclination of 4° with respect to the ecliptic.

Naming 

Based on a suggestion by Belgian amateur astronomer Jean Meeus, this minor planet was named after Robert Anson Heinlein (1907–1988), the Dean of Science Fiction, author of the mainstream literary classic Stranger in a Strange Land, and science fiction novels Starship Troopers and The Moon is a Harsh Mistress. The official naming citation was published by the Minor Planet Center on 13 April 2006.

Heinlein helped narrate The Moon Landing with Walter Cronkite on CBS in 1969, was involved in the planning of the Star Wars Defense program in the 1980s, contributed the words Waldo and Grok to the English language, and popularized the phrases Space Marine, TANSTAAFL, and Pay it Forward.

Physical characteristics 

Robheinlein is an L-type asteroid in the SDSS-based taxonomy. It has an absolute magnitude of 14.1. As of 2018, no rotational lightcurve has been obtained from photometric observations. The body's rotation period, pole and shape remain unknown.

Diameter and albedo 

According to the survey carried out by the NEOWISE mission of NASA's Wide-field Infrared Survey Explorer, Robheinlein measures 3.588 kilometers in diameter and its surface has a high albedo of 0.314.

References

External links 
 Lightcurve Database Query (LCDB), at www.minorplanet.info
 Dictionary of Minor Planet Names, Google books
 Discovery Circumstances: Numbered Minor Planets (5001)-(10000) – Minor Planet Center
 
 

006312
006312
Discoveries by Henry E. Holt
Named minor planets
19900914